The Karl Valentin Order was established by the Carnival club Munich Society Narrhalla e.V. on the occasion of its 80th anniversary. It was awarded for the first time in 1973. The Karl Valentin Order commemorates the legendary Bavarian humorist Karl Valentin (1882–1948). According to the foundation's protocol, the medal is awarded to a personality from art, politics, science, literature or sport for a humorous and profound comment or deed, for extraordinary work as an artist or to an outstanding figure in public life. The award ceremony takes place at the beginning of each year as part of the Narrhalla Soirée in the Deutsches Theater Munich.

Recipients

 1973: Werner Finck
 1974: Vicco von Bülow (Loriot)
 1975: 
 1976: Gert Fröbe
 1977: Franz Josef Strauß
 1978: Luis Trenker
 1979: August Everding
 1980: Bruno Kreisky
 1981: Sir Peter Ustinov
 1982: Hans-Dietrich Genscher
 1983: 
 1984: Helmut Kohl
 1985: Ephraim Kishon
 1986: Emil Steinberger
 1987: Norbert Blüm
 1988: Rudi Carrell
 1989: Joseph Kardinal Ratzinger
 1990: Aenne Burda
 1991: Peter Weck
 1992: Jürgen Möllemann
 1993: Harald Juhnke
 1994: 
 1995: Otto Schenk
 1996: Edmund Stoiber
 1997: Mario Adorf
 1998: Senta Berger
 1999: Christian Ude
 2000: Roman Herzog
 2001: Thomas Gottschalk
 2002: Christiane Hörbiger
 2003: Alfred Biolek
 2004: Fritz Wepper
 2005: Helmut Dietl
 2006: Sir Peter Jonas
 2007: Iris Berben
 2008: Günther Beckstein
 2009: Hape Kerkeling
 2010: Maria Furtwängler
 2011: Michael Herbig
 2012: Vitali Klitschko and Wladimir Klitschko
 2013: Til Schweiger
 2014: Horst Seehofer
 2015: Heino
 2016:  and 
 2017: Dieter Reiter
 2018: Philipp Lahm
 2019: Andreas Gabalier
 2020: Markus Söder
 2021: Dieter Hallervorden

References

External links
 

German awards
Comedy and humor awards
Awards established in 1973